The Government Sadiq College Women University (GSCWU) is a public university located in Bahawalpur, Punjab, Pakistan.

History

The College was founded by Nawab Sir Sadiq Khan Abbasi V as an intermediate college in 1944. In 1957, it was upgraded to a degree college. The college was upgraded again into a post-graduate college in 2010, as Master level programs were instated.

In December 2012, the College was approved as a full-fledged university. It is the only women's university in Bahawalpur Division, providing female students with standard education.

Programs

GSCWU offers undergraduate and postgraduate programmes in the following disciplines:

Information Technology
Computer Science
Botany
Zoology
English
Education
Urdu
Economics
Mathematics
Business Administration
Applied Psychology
Chemistry
Physics
Islamic Studies
GSCWU offers MPhil programs in
Mathematics
Chemistry
Urdu
Islamiat
GSCWU also offers Ph.D programs in
Mathematics
Chemistry

See also
 University of Sahiwal
 Government College Women University, Faisalabad
 Government College Women University, Sialkot
 University of Okara
 Women University Multan

References

External links
 GSCWU official website

Public universities and colleges in Punjab, Pakistan
1944 establishments in India
Educational institutions established in 1944
Universities and colleges in Bahawalpur
Women's universities and colleges in Pakistan